WBLQ (1230 AM) is a radio station licensed to serve Westerly, Rhode Island.  The station is owned by Diponti Communications.

History

1940s

1949
The station, then called WERI, began broadcasting on 1230kc. on July 1, 1949, using Day/Night power of 250 watts, non-directional.  The station still uses its original 185-foot, Blaw-Knox, self-supporting tower, on Margin Street, beside the Pawcatuck River.

1960s
The FCC increases the daytime power of all Class IV AM stations to 1,000 watts. WERI still has to reduce power to 250 watts at night, as did all other stations on the same frequency.

1966
WERI adds F.M. service with WERI-FM/103.7 (Channel 279) (now WVEI-FM). The FM antenna is initially mounted to the side of the AM tower on Margin Street in downtown Westerly. The FM station broadcasts for only a few days from this location before it is shut down due to harmonic interference to TV channel 12.

1968
WERI-FM moves its transmitter to a new location on Route 3 in Ashaway, and begins regular broadcasting.

1970s
The FCC increases the nighttime power of all Class IV stations from 250 to 1,000 watts, including WERI.

1980s
WERI-FM moves its transmitter closer to Providence, changes callsign to "WWRX", and effectively becomes a Providence station.

1990s
WERI-FM (WWRX) is sold to an independent owner from the AM station (WERI).

1999
In a separate transaction, WERI was sold to Boston University, and the callsign was changed to WXNI on January 4.  As WXNI It aired a format of news and talk from National Public Radio. It was a repeater of WRNI in Providence, and the two stations combined to provide a locally focused NPR member for Rhode Island–the forerunner of what evolved into Rhode Island Public Radio (now The Public's Radio).

2000s

2007
In December, BU reached an agreement to sell WXNI to Diponti Communications for a reported $350,000. The move came after a local group took control of WRNI and acquired WAKX (later WRNI-FM, now WNPE) in Narragansett Pier to serve as its southern satellite.

2009
Diponti Communications moved the local news and variety programming of WBLQ-LP (96.7 FM, Ashaway, Rhode Island) to WXNI's more powerful AM signal.  WXNI begins broadcasting in C-QUAM A.M. Stereo. WXNI changes call letters to WBLQ November 29.

2010s

2019

WBLQ begins broadcasting on FM translator W276DF (103.1 MHz) in November.

2020s

2021

December 1, WBLQ begins the "Time Machine", weekday evenings and overnights.  The Time Machine is a 1960s, 70s and 80s music format based upon the "WNBC Time Machine" aired in New York City, . The format was built by WBLQ on-air personalities Steve West and Bob Gilmore, with advice from former WNBC PD Dale Parsons.

2022

On the night of October 13, WBLQ owner Chris DiPaola died unexpectedly from an apparent heart attack . This came shortly after the station had settled with the city of Westerly on a five-year lease extension.

References

External links
 

 WBLQ New Year's Eve show, Interview with Dale Parsons.  From Airchexx.com 
Westerly Sun article about change of control of WXNI.
Pictures from NECRAT featuring the installation of the A.M. Stereo exciter.

BLQ
Westerly, Rhode Island
Radio stations established in 1949
1949 establishments in Rhode Island
Full service radio stations in the United States